Flat is an unincorporated community in southern Phelps County, Missouri, United States. It is located approximately sixteen miles southwest of Rolla. The community is at the intersection of Missouri routes M and T. Edgar Springs lies about four miles to the southeast at the intersection of route M and U.S. Route 63. The headwaters of Mill Creek are just to the east of the community. The village lies within the boundaries of the Mark Twain National Forest.

A post office called Flat was established in 1895, and remained in operation until 1967.  The community was so named on account of the flat land in a nearby forest.

References

Unincorporated communities in Phelps County, Missouri
Unincorporated communities in Missouri